Martha Stone Hubbell (1814 – August 1856) was an American author.

Biography
She was born in Oxford, Connecticut, in 1814; died in North Stonington, Connecticut, in 1856. She was the daughter of Dr. Noah Stone, and married Reverend Stephen Hubbell (1802–1884) in 1832. She wrote children's stories for the American and Massachusetts Sunday school Union, and The Shady Side, or Life in a Country Parsonage, by a Pastor's Wife (Boston, 1853). This was intended as a counterpart to The Sunny Side by Elizabeth Stuart Phelps (1815–1852) and 40.000 copies were sold in a year.

References

1814 births
1856 deaths
People from Oxford, Connecticut
American women novelists
19th-century American women writers
19th-century American novelists
Novelists from Connecticut
American children's writers
American women children's writers